

Events 
Wolfgang Amadeus Mozart composes his opera Idomeneo at Munich.
The Danish royal anthem, "Kong Christian", is first sung.
Carl Philipp Emanuel Bach's Versuch über die wahre Art das Clavier zu spielen goes into its third edition.
1780–1782 Emanuel Bach revises his Magnificat Wq 215 (H 772) (Hamburg version).

Classical music 
Carl Friedrich Abel – 6 String Trios, Op. 16
Carl Philipp Emanuel Bach 
Keyboard Sonata in F major, H.269
Keyboard Sonata in A major, H.270
Rondo in G major, H.271
Geistliche Gesänge, Book 1 H.749
Johann Christian Bach 
6 Sonatas for Keyboard and Violin or Flute, Op.16 (W.B 10-15a)
6 Keyboard Sonatas, Op. 17
2 Keyboard Quintets, Op. 22
Jean-Jacques Beauvarlet-Charpentier – 12 Noëls avec un Carillon des morts
Franz Benda – Violin Sonata in C minor, L3.9
Friedrich Wilhelm Heinrich Benda 
Viola Concerto in F major, LorB 314
3 Sonatas, Op. 3
Georg Benda – Sammlung Vermischter Stücke
Luigi Boccherini 
6 String Sextets, G.454-459 (Op. 23)
Musica notturna delle strade di Madrid (Op. 30)
6 String Quintets, G.325-330 (Op.31)
6 String Quartets, G.201-206 (Op.32)
Giuseppe Maria Cambini – 6 Trios for 2 Violins and Cello, Op. 15
Luigi Cherubini – 6 Harpsichord Sonatas
Muzio Clementi – 5 Piano Sonatas and a Duet, Op.1a
Carl Ditters von Dittersdorf – Job (oratorio)
Fedele Fenaroli – 9 Harpsichord Sonatas
Joseph Haydn 
Symphony No.62 in D major, Hob.I:62
Symphony No.74 in E-flat major, Hob.I:74
Keyboard Sonata in C major, Hob.XVI:35
Keyboard Sonata in D major, Hob.XVI:37
Keyboard Sonata in E-flat major, Hob.XVI:38
Keyboard Sonata in G major, Hob.XVI:39
Leopold Kozeluch 
3 Keyboard Sonatas, Opp. 1-2
3 Sonatas for Keyboard and Violin, Op. 17
Franziska Lebrun – 6 Violin Sonatas, Opp. 1-2
Wolfgang Amadeus Mozart 
Symphony No. 34 in C major, K.338
3 Minuets, K. 363
Josef Myslivecek – 6 Divertimenti
Antonio Rosetti 
Symphony in D major, M.A12
Oboe Concerto in C major, M.C30
Friedrich Schwindl – 6 Quintets or Trios, Op. 10
Carl Stamitz 
Flute Concerto in G major, Op. 29
Clarinet Concerto No. 4 in B-flat major
Johann Franz Xaver Sterkel – Sonata for Violin and Keyboard in B-flat major, StWV 194
Luigi Tomasini – 3 String Quartets, Op. 8
Johann Baptist Wanhal – 6 String Trios, Op. 17

Opera 
Domenico Cimarosa 
Caio Mario
Le donne rivali
Il falegname
I finti nobili
Franz Danzi – Cleopatra
André Grétry – Aucassin et Nicolette
Franz Joseph Haydn – La Fedeltà premiata, Hob.XXVIII:10
Wolfgang Amadeus Mozart – Zaide (unfinished)
Josef Myslivecek – Antigono
Giovanni Paisiello – Il Barbiere di Siviglia
Niccolò Piccinni – Atys
Bernardo Porta – La Principessa d'Amalfi
Joseph Bologne Saint-Georges – L'Amant anonime (premiered March 8)

Methods and theory writings 

 Anonymous – ABCDario Musico (Bath: printed for the Authors, and sold at the Rooms, 1780.)
 Salvatore Bertezen – Principi della musica
Fedele Fenaroli – Regole musicali per i principianti di cembalo
 Johann Adam Hiller – Anweisung zum musikalisch-zierlichen Gesange (Leipzig: Johann Friedrich Junius, 1780)
 Georg Caspar Hodermann – Kurzer Unterricht für Musik-Anfänger
 Louis-Francois Henri Lefebure – Nouveau solfége

Births 
January 14 – François-Joseph Dizi, harpist
February 2 – Ananias Davisson, shape-note advocate (died 1857)
February 8 
Walenty Karol Kratzer, composer
Franz Anton Morgenroth, composer (died 1847)
March 10 – Juan José Landaeta, composer
May 22 – Jan Emmanuel Dulezalek, composer
May 28 – Joseph Frohlich, composer
June 18 – Michael Henkel, composer (died 1851)
July 25 – Christian Theodor Weinlig, composer
November 2 – Alexandrine-Caroline Branchu, soprano
November 3 – Victor Dourlen, composer
November 9 – Carl Borromäus von Miltitz, composer (died 1845)
November 16 – Robert Archibald Smith, composer
November 17 – Franz Clement, composer (died 1842)
November 22 – Conradin Kreutzer, composer and conductor (died 1849)
December 18 – Johann Martin Friedrich Nisle, composer (died c. 1861) 
date unknown 
Ferdinand Gasse, French composer (died 1840)
Franciszek Lessel, Polish composer (died 1838)

Deaths 
January 1 – Johann Ludwig Krebs, German composer (born 1713)
January 4 – Hedvig Wigert, opera singer (b. 1748)
January 10 – Francesco Antonio Vallotti, organist, composer and music theorist (b. 1697)
February 1 – Johann Ludwig Krebs, composer (b. 1713)
April 21 – Ferdinand Zellbell, composer
May 9 – Francisco Hernández Illana, Spanish composer (c.1700)
May 14 – Pierre Montan Berton, Father of Henri-Montan Berton and composer (born 1727)
August 19 – Bernhard Haltenberger, composer
September 6 – George Alexander Stevens, songwriter (b. 1710)
December 14 – Ignatius Sancho, composer and actor (b. c. 1729)
date unknown – Martin Nürenbach, dancer

References 

 
18th century in music
Music by year